ICFAI University, Meghalaya is a private university located in  Tura and Shillong  in Meghalaya, India.

References

External links

2009 establishments in Meghalaya
Universities and colleges in Meghalaya
Educational institutions established in 2009
Education in Shillong
Private universities in India